is a Japanese television series originally aired in 1992 by Fuji Television. Eikaiwa, Taisō and Zuiikin mean "English conversation", "gymnastic exercises" and "voluntary muscles", respectively. The series combines English language lessons with gymnastic exercise programs. The series consists of 24 episodes.

Background 
In 1987, Fuji Television, call sign JOCX-TV, branded their late-night/early-morning slots collectively as JOCX-TV2 (meaning "alternative JOCX-TV") in an effort to market the traditionally unprofitable time slots and give opportunities to young creators to express their new ideas. The broadcaster produced numerous experimental programs on low budgets under this and follow-on brands until 1995. One such program tried to help viewers to fall asleep while another showed an actor reading out a well-known novel and nothing else. Zuiikin' English was born under these circumstances.

Format
At the beginning of the show, Fernandez Verde, the host, explains his theory of language learning. He proclaims that different cultures use muscles in different proportions due to their customs. For example, in one episode he states Japanese people have stronger lower back muscles (from bowing and keeping a lower posture), and a different leg muscle structure (due to squatting for long periods of time). He believes that using those muscles while learning a culture's language will create strong associations in one's mind and hasten learning.

Then a sketch starts like an ordinary language lesson program. Every time a new English phrase is introduced, the sketch pauses and switches to the Zuiikin Gals, a threesome gymnastic exercise team. The girls perform synchronized exercises while smiling and chanting the phrase. The choice of phrases include the following:

 Take anything you want.
 Spare me my life!
 I was robbed by two men.
 Call an ambulance please.
 I have a bad case of diarrhea.
 I feel feverish and sluggish.
 I am allergic to penicillin.
 Is there anyone who speaks Japanese?
 How many of these should I take?
 Will my insurance cover today?
 You must be tired from your long flight.
 He gives his sincere regards.
 Is the taxi on its way?
 How much do you think it will cost?
 Please take the roundabout route to avoid the traffic jam.
 How far is it still?
 Let me off at the next corner.
 Keep the change.
 I'll get started on it immediately.
 Lovely golf weather today!
 It's in the middle of the fairway.
 Would you like something cold to drink?
 What is the fastest way to get to a theater?
 Thank you for inviting me tonight.
 You have a wonderful place.
 I'm afraid I must be going.
 Unbelievable! It's amazing! We did it!
 Is that so? Really? Are you sure?
 Never mind.
 The climax scene really got to me.
 How dare you say such a thing to me!
 You drive me crazy!
 Don't make fun of me.
 It's your fault that this happened.
 Leave me alone!
 I can't stand the sight of you.
 Hasta la vista, baby.
 Let's go Dutch!
 Do you have plans for tomorrow?
 Will you go out with me tomorrow?
 I will pick you up at your place.
 You look sensational in that dress.
 Are you serious about anyone?
 I want us to be more than just friends.
 Here's to your lovely eyes.

In the final episode, three native English speaking men formed the Zuiikin Boys and demonstrated gymnastic movements while chanting supposedly useful Japanese phrases. One such phrase, "tsumaranai mono desuga" (つまらない物ですが) ends up translating rather roughly to "please accept this trifling thing". No translations are provided during these Japanese lessons as there are for the English lessons, only Japanese characters and romanisations.

Initial broadcasting in Japan
The program was initially broadcast in the spring of 1992. It occupied an early-morning slot around 5 AM. This allocation itself was probably a move to perfect the parody because the long-running gymnastic exercise program by national station NHK was also broadcast in early mornings (around 6 AM). This early broadcast time was one of the main reasons why the series passed unnoticed to most people in Japan.

Internet meme
It was not until the broadcaster decided to rerun the series from November 2005 on their satellite channels that the program, and especially the Zuiikin Gals, started to attract international attention as a meme, the English phrase "I have a bad case of diarrhea" receiving the most attention. The diarrhea clip uploaded on YouTube has been viewed more than 7,000,000 times (as of March 2021). Clips from the show have been featured on radio and TV programs such as The Opie and Anthony Show, The Soup, Anderson Cooper 360, Upload with Shaquille O'Neal and The Tonight Show with Jay Leno in America, and Rude Tube and 8 out of 10 Cats in the UK.

The Zuiikin Gals are Maiko Miyazawa (宮沢麻衣子), Reiko Saito (斎藤レイ子) and Takako Inayoshi (稻吉貴子), whose names are displayed at the beginning of each exercise. Inayoshi is still active in the entertainment business as an actress.

References

External links 
 

1990s satirical television series
Internet memes introduced in 2005
1992 Japanese television series debuts
1992 Japanese television series endings
Fuji TV original programming